Natalia Estrada (born Gijón, Asturias, Spain, September 3, 1972) is an actress, model and television presenter on Spanish television.

Biography
When she was 15 she moved to Madrid where she did music and acting classes and became a flamenco and classical ballet dancer.

She also had the opportunity to appear with Penélope Cruz on the musical program "La quinta marcha" from (1990–1991), on the Spanish Telecinco channel.
Natalia was a presenter for the Miss Spain competitions and a presenter for news and soccer telecasts.
She jumped to the big screen in 1992, when she was cast in the film Aqui, el que no corre... vuela.
She has worked in Italian TV, with roles in "Il Quizzone", and "Campioni di ballo", and made her important debut in a film called "Aqui El Que No Corre As Vuela,". In 1996 she had her first big hit in "The Cyclone." 
Natalia appeared as herself in a comedy, "Paparazzi", and was cast in the musical comedy called "Jolly Blu". In 2006 she had a small role in El Club de Flo on La Sexta Spanish TV channel.

Television

"¡Mira quién baila!" (3 episodes)
Episode dated 8 January 2007 (8 January 2007) - Herself

 "Club de Flo, El" (5 episodes)
Episode dated 26 May 2006 (26 May 2006) - Herself  
Episode dated 12 September 2006 (12 September 2006) - Herself

 "Tan a gustito" (1 episode)
Episode #1.2 (30 October 2005) - Herself

 "Corazón de..." (1 episode)
Episode dated 20 September 2005 (20 September 2005) - Herself

 "La Noche abierta," (1 episode)
Episode dated 20 December 2001 (20 December 2001) - Herself

 "Bellezas al agua" (9 episodes)
Episode dated 4 July 1992 (4 July 1992) - Host

Filmography
 Hora final (1992)
 Aquí, el que no corre...vuela (1992)
 "Bellezas al agua" (9 episodes, 1992)
 The Cyclone (1996)
 Jolly Blu (1998)
 Olé (2006)

See also
Asturian people
Almudena Fernandez
Sonia Ferrer
Ana Alvarez

External links
 Natalia Estrada's Bio at AskMen.com 

 Images of Natalia Estrada
Natalia Estrada @ Ranch Academy

1972 births
Living people
People from Gijón
Spanish actresses
Spanish female models